St John Fisher Catholic High School is a mixed comprehensive secondary school in Wigan, Greater Manchester, England. It is named after the Catholic martyr John Fisher.

Academics
The schools performs well in league tables compared with other local schools. It was among the top five performing schools in the Wigan LEA in the 2011 GCSEs.

Sport
The school has been associated with rugby league since the 1970s. In the late 1990s and early 2000s, one year's team went unbeaten for five years, earning a place in the Guinness Book of Records. The school has produced notable alumni, including Shaun Edwards, the late Billy Joe Edwards, Sean Gleeson and Chris Ashton.

Notable former pupils
Chris Ashton, dual-code rugby international
Shaun Edwards, former rugby league international
Owen Farrell
Sean O'Loughlin, rugby league international
Sam Tomkins, rugby league international

References

External links

Secondary schools in the Metropolitan Borough of Wigan
Catholic secondary schools in the Archdiocese of Liverpool
Voluntary aided schools in England